Zaychar is a village in Ruen Municipality, in Burgas Province, in southeastern Bulgaria.

Zaychar Glacier on Graham Land in Antarctica is named after the settlement.

References

Villages in Burgas Province